Whatcha Gonna Do? is an album by British blues rock musician Peter Green, who was the founder of Fleetwood Mac and a member from 1967–70. Released in 1981, this was his fourth solo album, the third in his 'middle period' of the late 1970s and early 1980s, and his last for PVK Records.

All the tracks on the album were written by Green's brother Mike.

Track listing
All tracks written by Mike Green.
"Gotta See Her Tonight" – 5:46
"Promised Land" – 3:29
"Bullet in the Sky" – 3:19
"Give Me Back My Freedom" – 5:37
"Last Train to San Antone" – 5:29
"To Break Your Heart" – 3:52
"Bizzy Lizzy" – 3:25
"Lost My Love" – 5:21
"Like a Hot Tomato" – 3:04
"Head Against the Wall" – 3:44

Bonus tracks on 2005 (CD) release
"Woman Don't" – 5:03
"Whatcha Gonna Do?" – 3:48

Personnel

Musicians
Peter Green – lead guitar, vocals
Ronnie Johnson – rhythm guitar
Roy Shipston – keyboards
Paul Westwood – bass guitar
Mo Foster – bass guitar
Dave Mattacks – drums
Lennox Langton – percussion
Jeff Daly – saxophone

Technical
 Peter Vernon-Kell – producer
 Peter Vernon-Kell & Roy Shipston – arrangements
 Mike Cooper – engineer, mixing

Charts

References

Peter Green (musician) albums
1980 albums